"Imagination" is a song by English electronic music production duo Gorgon City. It features the vocals from South-London vocalist Katy Menditta from their debut studio album Sirens. It was written by Gorgon City, Katy Menditta, Emeli Sandé, Mustafa Omer and James Murray and produced by Gorgon City and musical group Mojam. It was released as an EP with three additional remixes on 31 March 2015.

Composition
An uptempo house song with deep house influences which lasts three minutes and thirty eight seconds. The song has a tempo of 122 BPM.

The song was compared to previous singles "Ready for Your Love", "Here for You" and "Unmissable".

Track listing and formats
Digital download
 "Imagination"  – 3:38

EP
 "Imagination"  – 3:37
 "Imagination"  – 6:12
 "Imagination"  – 6:15
 "Imagination"  – 5:32

Charts

Weekly charts

Year-end charts

Certifications

References

2015 songs
2015 singles
Gorgon City songs
Virgin EMI Records singles
Black Butter Records singles
Songs written by Emeli Sandé
Songs written by Mustafa Omer
Songs written by Kye Gibbon
Songs written by Matt Robson-Scott